Drifting is a 1923 American silent drama film based on the Broadway play Drifting, by John Colton and Daisy H. Andrews. The play had starred Robert Warwick and Alice Brady.  The film was directed by Tod Browning and features Priscilla Dean, Wallace Beery, and Anna May Wong. It was produced and distributed by Universal Pictures.

Plot
Cassie Cook had played the opium selling game until fate and a bad shuffle compelled her to team up with her biggest rival, Jules Repin, and then the horror of the whole thing weighed down upon her and she determined to quit and leave China before it was too late. She had bought a lot of new gowns on credit, believing in Repin's promise that he had a big shipment of opium coming in which would give them both plenty of money. Now those gowns had to be paid for and Cassie's chum, Molly Morton, taken out of the country before a growing taste for opium got a final hold on her. So Cassie bet on a sure thing in the races and lost. "But I'm going to get you out, Kid," she told Molly, and as a last resort she went back to the game. Up in Hang Chow, a trouble-infested village near the poppy fields, she tried to trace the shipment Repin expected. A white man was there — supposed to be opening an abandoned mine. It was her business to find out if he was a government inspector seeking the den of the dope dealers. She posed as a novelist, and he, believing in her, told her that he was there to fight the dope menace. Cassie felt like a cheat of the lowest order and she turned against her comrades, but they, by trickery, found out what she had learned from the mine superintendent. In a flash they set the little world ablaze with rebellion and the soul of Cassie Cook was cleansed in the fires of remorse as she battled for what she believed was the right cause, and out of it came a love that was clean and honorable.

Cast

Preservation

Copies of Drifting are located in the Gosfilmofond of Moscow and in the George Eastman House Motion Picture Collection. In 2012 the National Film Preservation Foundation awarded a grant to preserve a print that has Czech language intertitles which were translated back into English.

See also
 Anna May Wong on film and television
 List of American films of 1923

References

External links

1923 films
1923 drama films
American silent feature films
American black-and-white films
Silent American drama films
American films based on plays
Films directed by Tod Browning
Films set in China
Universal Pictures films
1920s American films